Marouen Maggaiz (born 28 July 1983) is a Tunisian handball goalkeeper for CSM București and the Tunisian national team.

He competed at the 2012 Summer Olympics in London, where the Tunisian team reached the quarterfinals.

References

External links

1983 births
Living people
Tunisian male handball players
Olympic handball players of Tunisia
Handball players at the 2012 Summer Olympics
Handball players at the 2016 Summer Olympics
Tunisian expatriate sportspeople in France
Tunisian expatriate sportspeople in Romania
Expatriate handball players
Montpellier Handball players